Ophias is a monotypic snout moth genus. Its only species, Ophias albiundalis, was described by Émile Louis Ragonot in February 1891. It is found in Pernambuco, Brazil.

References

Moths described in 1891
Chrysauginae
Monotypic moth genera
Moths of South America
Pyralidae genera
Taxa named by Émile Louis Ragonot